Hellín is an administrative neighborhood (barrio) of Madrid belonging to the district of San Blas-Canillejas.

As of 1 March 2020, it has a population of 9,403.

References 

Wards of Madrid
San Blas-Canillejas